Lead(II) iodate is an inorganic compound with the molecular formula Pb(IO3)2.  It is naturally found as heavy white powder.

Production
One way to produce lead(II) iodate involves the reaction of lead nitrate with double moles of potassium iodate.  Lead iodate can be precipitated precisely by simultaneous dropwise addition of equivalent solutions of lead nitrate and potassium iodate with water as a solvent at around 60 °C.

Pb(NO3)2(aq) + KIO3(aq) → KNO3(aq) + Pb(IO3)2(s)

Industrial mass production methods use a less precise method due to higher quantities of reactants.  Many other group 1 elements can be used in place of potassium to add iodate to the reaction due to solubility group 1 element iodates.

Uses
One use for the compound lead(II) iodate is the volumetric determination of lead content in ore.  The determination of lead content in a sample of ore begins with the precipitation and separation of lead as a sulfate.  The solution of this lead sulfate product is then slightly acidified and the lead is precipitated out as lead(II) iodate out by adding potassium iodate.  Lead(II) iodate can then be titrated in the presence of hydrochloric acid and chloroform to indicate the exact amount of lead that was dissolved from the original ore sample.  In this chemical process lead(II) iodate is used to isolate the lead found in a sample of ore from other chemicals present so that it can be studied and quantitated effectively.
PbSO4(aq) + KIO3(aq) → K2SO4(aq) + Pb(IO3)2(s)

References

Iodates
Lead compounds